Philip Bogan Keefer (September 4, 1875 – January 1, 1949) was a United States Navy sailor and a recipient of America's highest military decoration—the Medal of Honor—for his actions during the Spanish–American War.

For his actions during the incident, Keefer was issued the Medal of Honor five months later, on December 14, 1898.

Medal of Honor citation
Coopersmith Keefer's official Medal of Honor citation reads:
On board the U.S.S. Iowa off Santiago de Cuba, 20 July 1898. Following the blow-out of a manhole gasket of that vessel which caused the fireroom to be filled with live steam and the floor plates to be covered with boiling water, Keefer showed courageous and zealous conduct in hauling fires from 2 furnaces of
boiler B.

See also
 List of Medal of Honor recipients
 List of Medal of Honor recipients for the Spanish–American War

Notes

References

 
 

1875 births
1949 deaths
American military personnel of the Spanish–American War
United States Navy Medal of Honor recipients
United States Navy sailors
Burials at Arlington National Cemetery
People from Washington, D.C.
Spanish–American War recipients of the Medal of Honor